Sinegugu Maseko (born 29 June 1997) is a South African first-class cricketer. He was included in Boland's squad for the 2016 Africa T20 Cup.

References

External links
 

1997 births
Living people
South African cricketers
Boland cricketers
Place of birth missing (living people)